Hydrocortisone 21-butyrate is a form of hydrocortisone butyrate.

See also
 Glucocorticoid
 Corticosteroid

References

Corticosteroid esters
Corticosteroids
Butyrate esters